John Egan (13 June 1952 – 8 April 2012) was an Irish sportsperson. 

Egan was born in Tahilla (near Sneem), County Kerry. He played Gaelic football with his local club Sneem, his divisional side South Kerry and at senior level with the Kerry county team between 1975 and 1984.

Career
A prolific corner forward on the Kerry county team of the late 1970s and 1980s, Egan made his senior inter-county debut against Tipperary in the 1975 All-Ireland Senior Football Championship, and instantly marked his arrival onto the senior stage with two goals in the first round opener.

The 1975 success marked the beginning of a golden era for the county. Successive Munster titles in 1976 and 1977 were followed by consecutive defeats to Dublin at the All-Ireland SFC final and semi-final stages. However, in 1978, Egan scored in every round of the Championship, and Kerry went on to win again against Dublin in the final. The winning scoreline in that match of 5-11 to 0-9 failed to reflect Dublin's early dominance, which resulted in a rapid five-point lead. An initially shellshocked Kerry were inspired by a crucial Egan goal against the run of play, and they progressed to win a famous victory. Egan was a key part of the Kerry team that won a record-equalling four consecutive All-Ireland SFC titles (1978-1981). 

Egan's individual footballing talents were recognised with the awarding of five GAA All Stars Awards in 1975, 1977, 1978, 1980 and 1982.

His son, also John, plays association football and has been capped by the Republic of Ireland senior national side.

Health
In a Sunday Independent column published on 7 March 2010, Páidí Ó Sé wrote: "All our best wishes go to my old colleague John Egan who, I'm told, is not well right now. John is 58 and, of course, captained the Kerry team that lost to Offaly in the 1982 five-in-a-row final. He has six All-Ireland medals, and my Dublin rivals in the 1970s always regard him as the finest of our Kerry team. Robbie Kelleher, who has adopted Ventry as his home from home, will join with me in wishing the very best to John, and a speedy recovery."

Death
On 8 April 2012, Egan died at the age of 59 at his home in Cork following recent heart surgery.
He is survived by his wife Mary, son John, and daughter Máirín.

Gaelic Athletic Association president Christy Cooney paid tribute saying in a statement "John was an iconic footballer on arguably the most iconic team of all time and his undoubted skills and dedication were handsomely rewarded in an era that will be remembered fondly by Kerry supporters for evermore".

Kerry legend Pat Spillane described him as "one of greatest corner-forwards ever in Gaelic football, one who never craved the spotlight, He was a gentle giant and a warrior".

Former manager Mick O'Dwyer paid tribute by saying "There has never, at least in my understanding of Gaelic football, been a better inside forward than John Egan. I can't say he was the best, but I can say there was no-one better".

References

1952 births
2012 deaths
All Stars Awards winners (football)
Gaelic football forwards
Garda Síochána officers
Kerry inter-county Gaelic footballers
Munster inter-provincial Gaelic footballers
Sneem Gaelic footballers
Winners of six All-Ireland medals (Gaelic football)